Planet Shining is the first release by the Japanese trio M-Flo. Remixes of the songs from this album were released as The Replacement Percussionists.

Track listing
Disc 1
 Intro (interlude)
 Ten Below Blazing
 Announcement (interlude)
 Planet Shining
 Come Back to Me
 Guidance (interlude)
 Chronopsychology
 Hands
 Radio Show (interlude)
 Saywhatchugotta
 Just Be
 Line Holding (interlude)
 Quantum Leap
 L.O.T. (Love or Truth)
 Deep Within
 Been So Long
 Outro (interlude)
Disc 2 (The bonus CD Bug Planet Dub mixed by DJ Horii a.k.a. HoriiSport)
 Too Much Sense [DJ Alamo Remix]
 Mindstate [feat. sphere]
 Theme from Flo Jack [Mr. Drunk Remix by Mummy D]
 Mirrorball Satellite 2012 [SRATM Remix by Towa Tei]
 L.O.T. (Love or Truth) [DJ TONK Remix]

M-Flo albums
2000 albums
Avex Group albums